This article contains information about the literary events and publications of 1973.

Events
March 6 – The Montenegrin Academy of Sciences and Arts, founded as the Montenegrin Society for Science and Arts (Crnogorsko društvo za nauku i umjetnost) in Podgorica, elects its first members.
May 14
New orthography for the Greenlandic language is introduced.
François Truffaut's film Day for Night (La Nuit américaine) premieres; novelist Graham Greene (credited as Henry Graham) has a cameo role as an English insurance company representative.
June 21
The Supreme Court of the United States delivers its decision in the landmark case Miller v. California, establishing the "Miller test" for determining obscenity.
Virago Press, registered on June 18 in the U.K. by Carmen Callil mainly to publish classics by women writers, holds its first board meeting; its first book will be published in 1975.
July 26 – Peter Shaffer's drama Equus is premièred in London by the National Theatre company at The Old Vic.
September – Following the overthrow of President Allende by a military regime, book burnings take place in Chile.
September 16 – Chilean poet and playwright Víctor Jara, detained four days earlier as a political prisoner in Estadio Chile and tortured during the 1973 Chilean coup d'état, is shot and killed. His last poem, "Estadio Chile", is preserved in memories and scraps of paper retained by fellow detainees.
September 25 – The funeral of Chilean poet Pablo Neruda becomes a focus for protests against the new government of Augusto Pinochet.
December 3 – French police of the Direction de la surveillance du territoire, disguised as plumbers, are caught trying to install a spy microphone in the directors' office of the Paris satirical paper Le Canard enchaîné.
c. December 27 – Aleksandr Solzhenitsyn's novel The Gulag Archipelago (Архипелаг ГУЛАГ, written 1958–1968) is first published, by the Paris publisher Éditions du Seuil from a typescript smuggled out of the Soviet Union.
unknown dates
André Brink's novel Kennis van die aand ("Looking on Darkness") becomes the first Afrikaans book banned by the government of South Africa.
Mikhail Bulgakov's novel The Master and Margarita (Ма́стер и Маргари́та) is first published complete in Moscow (in the form left at the author's death in 1940), by Khudozhestvennaya Literatura.
Frank Herbert becomes director-photographer of the television show, The Tillers.
Robert B. Parker starts the Boston-based Spenser book series with his debut crime novel The Godwulf Manuscript.

New books

Fiction
Nelson Algren – The Last Carousel (short stories)
Martin Amis – The Rachel Papers
J. G. Ballard – Crash
René Barjavel – The Immortals
Donald Barr - Space Relations
Thomas Berger – Regiment of Women
Joseph Payne Brennan – Stories of Darkness and Dread
Rita Mae Brown – Rubyfruit Jungle
John Brunner – The Stone That Never Came Down
Ramsey Campbell – Demons by Daylight
Jerome Charyn – The Tar Baby
Agatha Christie – Postern of Fate
Arthur C. Clarke – Rendezvous with Rama
Basil Copper – From Evil's Pillow
Julio Cortázar – Libro de Manuel (A Manual for Manuel)
L. Sprague de Camp – The Fallible Fiend
L. Sprague de Camp and Catherine Crook de Camp, editors – Tales Beyond Time
Michel Déon – Un Taxi mauve
August Derleth – The Chronicles of Solar Pons
Michael Ende – Momo
Paul E. Erdman – The Billion Dollar Sure Thing
J. G. Farrell – The Siege of Krishnapur
Leon Forrest – There Is A Tree More Ancient Than Eden
William Goldman – The Princess Bride
Graham Greene – The Honorary Consul
Elisabeth Harvor – Women and Children (11 stories revised as Our Lady of All Distances in 1991)
L.P. Hartley – The Will and the Way
Robert A. Heinlein – Time Enough for Love
Witi Ihimaera – Tangi
Hammond Innes – Golden Soak
Joseph Joffo – A Bag of Marbles (Un sac de billes)
B. S. Johnson – Christie Malry's Own Double-Entry
James Jones – A Touch of Danger
Anna Kavan – Who Are You?
Brian Killick – The Heralds
Dean R. Koontz – Demon Seed
Jerzy Kosiński – The Devil Tree
Milan Kundera – Life Is Elsewhere (Život je jinde, first published in French as La Vie est ailleurs)
Derek Lambert 
Beau Blackstone
Blackstone's Fancy
Clarice Lispector – Água Viva
Robert Ludlum – The Matlock Paper
John D. MacDonald – The Turquoise Lament
Cormac McCarthy – Child of God
Robert Marasco – Burnt Offerings
Toni Morrison – Sula
Iris Murdoch – The Black Prince
Robert B. Parker – The Godwulf Manuscript
Mervyn Peake (died 1968) – The Rhyme of the Flying Bomb
Anthony Powell – Temporary Kings
Thomas Pynchon – Gravity's Rainbow
Ernst von Salomon – Der tote Preuße
Irwin Shaw – Evening in Byzantium
Aleksandr Solzhenitsyn – The Gulag Archipelago (Архипелаг ГУЛАГ)
Richard G. Stern – Other Men's Daughters
Rex Stout – Please Pass the Guilt
Jacqueline Susann – Once Is Not Enough
Julian Symons – The Plot Against Roger Rider
Hunter S. Thompson – Fear and Loathing on the Campaign Trail '72
Jack Vance – The Anome
Mario Vargas Llosa – Captain Pantoja and the Special Service (Pantaleón y las visitadoras)
Gore Vidal – Burr
Kurt Vonnegut, Jr. – Breakfast of Champions
Patrick White – The Eye of the Storm
Rudy Wiebe – Temptations of Big Bear
Venedikt Yerofeyev – Moscow-Petushki (Moscow to the end of the line; first commercial publication, in Israel)
Roger Zelazny
To Die in Italbar
Today We Choose Faces

Children and young people
Nina Bawden – Carrie's War
Thea Beckman – Crusade in Jeans (Kruistocht in spijkerbroek)
Lois Duncan – I Know What You Did Last Summer
Penelope Lively – The Ghost of Thomas Kempe
Ruth Manning-Sanders – A Book of Ogres and Trolls
Ruth Park – The Muddle-Headed Wombat and the Bush Band
Bill Peet – The Spooky Tail of Prewitt Peacock
Dick Roughsey – The Giant Devil Dingo
Doris Buchanan Smith – A Taste of Blackberries
Patricia Wrightson – The Nargun and the Stars

Drama
Alan Ayckbourn – The Norman Conquests
Griselda Gambaro – Information For Foreigners (Información para extranjeros)
Jean Poiret – La Cage aux Folles
David Rudkin – Cries from Casement as His Bones are Brought to Dublin (radio play)
Peter Shaffer – Equus
Wole Soyinka – The Bacchae of Euripides

Poetry

Allen Curnow – An Abominable Temper and Other Poems
Tomás Rivera – Always and other poems

Non-fiction
Ernest Becker – The Denial of Death
Howard W. Bergerson – Palindromes and Anagrams
Allan W. Eckert – The Court-Martial of Daniel Boone
Antonia Fraser – Cromwell, Our Chief of Men
Nancy Friday – My Secret Garden
Christopher Lloyd – Foliage Plants
Peter Maas – Serpico
New York Bible Society International – New Testament, New International Version (translated into modern American English)
Nigel Nicolson – Portrait of a Marriage (compiled from writings of his mother, Vita Sackville-West, died 1962)
Tim O'Brien – If I Die in a Combat Zone, Box Me Up and Ship Me Home
Bill Owens – Suburbia
John Pearson – James Bond: The Authorised Biography of 007
Flora Rheta Schreiber – Sybil
E. F. Schumacher – Small Is Beautiful
Binod Bihari Verma – Maithili Karna Kayasthak Panjik Sarvekshan (in Maithili)
Maureen and Tony Wheeler – Across Asia on the Cheap
Paula Wolfert – Couscous and Other Good Food from Morocco

Births
January 1 – Bryan Thao Worra, Lao writer
January 8 – Madhulika Liddle, Indian writer
January 13 – Lois Pryce, Scottish-born travel writer and journalist
February 10 – Núria Añó, Catalan writer
February 21
Jacob M. Appel, American short story writer and bioethicist
Mariana Savka, Ukrainian poet, children's writer, translator and publisher
April 15 – Maria V. Snyder, American fantasy and science-fiction writer
May 10 – Tana French, American-born mystery novelist and actress
May 20 – Natalka Sniadanko, Ukrainian writer, journalist and translator
June 2 – David Bezmozgis, Latvian-Canadian writer
June 16 – Veronica Rossi, Brazilian-American young adult novelist
August 13 – Kamila Shamsie, Pakistan-born novelist
August 18 – Victoria Coren Mitchell, English writer, presenter and poker player, daughter of Alan Coren
November 12 - Jay Kristoff, Australian fantasy and science-fiction author
November 17 – Marianna Kiyanovska, Ukrainian poet, translator and literary scholar
December 20 – Maarja Kangro, Estonian author and poet
December 24 – Stephenie Meyer, American young-adult vampire romance writer and film producer
unknown dates
Frances Hardinge, English young people's fiction writer
Ahmed Saadawi, Iraqi writer
Juan Gabriel Vásquez, Colombian novelist

Deaths
January 15 – Neil M. Gunn, Scottish novelist, dramatist and critic (born 1891)
February 22
Elizabeth Bowen, Anglo-Irish novelist and short story writer (born 1899)
Brigitte Reimann, East German novelist (cancer) (born 1933)
March 5 - Robert C. O'Brien, American novelist (born 1918)
March 6 – Pearl S. Buck, American novelist (born 1892)
March 18 – Roland Dorgelès, French novelist and memoirist (born 1885)
March 26 – Sir Noël Coward, English dramatist and humorist (born 1899)
April 9 – Warren Lewis, Irish author (born 1895)
April 20 – Elisabeth Hauptmann, German writer (born 1897)
April 28 – Jacques Maritain, French philosopher (born 1882)
April 30 – Jirō Osaragi (大佛 次郎, Haruhiku Nojiri), Japanese novelist (born 1897)
May 21 – Carlo Emilio Gadda, Italian poet and linguist (born 1893)
June 4 – Arna Bontemps, American poet (born 1902)
June 9 – John Creasey, English crime writer (born 1908)
 June 10 – William Inge, American playwright (born 1913)
June 30 – Nancy Mitford, English novelist and biographer (born 1904)
July 11 – Nobuko Yoshiya (吉屋 信子, Yoshiya Nobuko), Japanese romantic novelist (born 1896)
July 29 – Henri Charrière, French writer and criminal (born 1906)
August 1 – Ann Quin, English novelist (born 1936)
September 2 – J. R. R. Tolkien, English fantasy writer and scholar (born 1892)
September 9 – S. N. Behrman, American playwright, screenwriter and biographer (born 1893)
September 13 – Sajjad Zaheer, Urdu writer and revolutionary (born 1899)
September 20 – William Plomer, South African-born British novelist, poet and literary editor (born 1903)
September 23 – Pablo Neruda, Chilean poet (born 1904)
September 29 – W. H. Auden, English-born poet (born 1907)
October 6 – Margaret Wilson, American novelist (born 1882)
October 28 – Sergio Tofano, Italian dramatist (born 1886)
November 8 – Faruk Nafiz Çamlıbel, Turkish poet, author and playwright (born 1898)
November 13 – B. S. Johnson, English novelist (suicide) (born 1933)
December 7 – Benn Levy, English playwright and politician (born 1900)
December 9 – Anthony Gilbert, English crime writer (born 1899)
December 11 – May Wedderburn Cannan, English poet (born 1893)
December 14 – Josef Magnus Wehner, German poet and playwright (born 1891)
unknown date – Kathleen Lindsay, English-born South African romance novelist (born 1903)

Awards
Nobel Prize in Literature: Patrick White

Canada
See 1973 Governor General's Awards for a complete list of winners and finalists for those awards.

France
Prix Goncourt: Jacques Chessex, L'Ogre
Prix Médicis French: Tony Duvert, Paysage de fantaisie
Prix Médicis International: Milan Kundera, Life Is Elsewhere

United Kingdom
Booker Prize: J. G. Farrell, The Siege of Krishnapur
Carnegie Medal for children's literature: Penelope Lively, The Ghost of Thomas Kempe
Cholmondeley Award: Patric Dickinson, Philip Larkin
Eric Gregory Award: John Beynon, Ian Caws, James Fenton, Keith Harris, David Howarth, Philip Pacey
James Tait Black Memorial Prize for fiction: Iris Murdoch, The Black Prince
James Tait Black Memorial Prize for biography: Robin Lane Fox, Alexander the Great
Queen's Gold Medal for Poetry: John Heath-Stubbs

United States
American Academy of Arts and Letters Gold Medal in Poetry, John Crowe Ransom
Hugo Award: Isaac Asimov, The Gods Themselves
Nebula Award: Arthur C. Clarke, Rendezvous with Rama
Newbery Medal for children's literature: Jean Craighead George, Julie of the Wolves
Pulitzer Prize for Drama: Jason Miller, That Championship Season
Pulitzer Prize for Fiction: Eudora Welty, The Optimist's Daughter
Pulitzer Prize for Poetry: Maxine Kumin, Up Country

Elsewhere
Miles Franklin Award: No award presented
Premio Nadal: José García Blázquez, El rito
Viareggio Prize: Achille Campanile, Manuale di conversazione

References

 
Years of the 20th century in literature